Carlos Rafael Rocha Ferreira, sometimes known as Rafael Rocha or Rato (born 14 March 1989  in Ribeirão Preto) is a Brazilian professional football player who plays as a left midfielder for União de Rondonópolis.

Club career

Early career
Rocha began his youth career at Desportivo Brasil. He later played at São Bento and Botafogo.

Politehnica Timișoara
In October 2010 Rafael Rocha signed with Politehnica Timişoara, being recommended there by Poli's defender, the Brazilian Hélder Maurílio. Rocha was presented together with Jiří Krejčí and he was handed the number 30. At the presentation, he said: "It's a unique opportunity for me. It's a great team and I want to meet the demands of that are here. Romanian football is very aggressive. I'll probably adjust harder, I hope the people here will have patience with me". He made his debut for Poli on the Dan Păltinişanu stadium on 26 February 2011 against Gaz Metan Mediaş, replacing Ianis Zicu in the 88th minute of the game.

Honours
Politehnica Timișoara
Liga II: 2011–12

References

1989 births
Living people
People from Ribeirão Preto
Brazilian footballers
Association football midfielders
Desportivo Brasil players
Esporte Clube São Bento players
Botafogo de Futebol e Regatas players
Rio Branco Esporte Clube players
Oeste Futebol Clube players
Capivariano Futebol Clube players
União Esporte Clube players
Campeonato Brasileiro Série B players
FC Politehnica Timișoara players
CS Concordia Chiajna players
Liga I players
Liga II players
Brazilian expatriate footballers
Expatriate footballers in Romania
Footballers from São Paulo (state)